Izbiska may refer to the following places:
Izbiska, Masovian Voivodeship (east-central Poland)
Izbiska, Silesian Voivodeship (south Poland)
Izbiska, Subcarpathian Voivodeship (south-east Poland)
Izbiska, Pomeranian Voivodeship (north Poland)